
Gmina Ożarów Mazowiecki is an urban-rural gmina (administrative district) in Warsaw West County, Masovian Voivodeship, in east-central Poland.

Villages
Apart from the town of Ożarów Mazowiecki, Gmina Ożarów Mazowiecki contains the villages and settlements of Bronisze, Duchnice, Gołaszew, Jawczyce, Kaputy, Konotopa, Koprki, Kręczki, Macierzysz, Michałówek, Mory, Myszczyn, Ołtarzew, Orły, Orły-Kolonia, Ożarów, Pilaszków, Piotrkówek Duży, Piotrkówek Mały, Płochocin, Pogroszew, Pogroszew-Kolonia, Strzykuły, Święcice, Szeligi, Umiastów, Wieruchów, Wolica and Wolskie.

Neighbouring gminas
Gmina Ożarów Mazowiecki is bordered by Warsaw, by the town of Piastów, and by the gminas of Błonie, Brwinów, Leszno and Stare Babice.

References

Polish official population figures 2006

Ozarow Mazowiecki
Warsaw West County